Sweethearts (also known as conversation hearts) are small heart-shaped sugar candies sold around Valentine's Day. Each heart is printed with a message such as "Be Mine", "Kiss Me", "Call Me", "Let's Get Busy", or "Miss You". Sweethearts were made by the New England Confectionery Company, or Necco, before being purchased by the Spangler Candy Company in 2018. They were also previously made by the Stark Candy Company. Necco manufactured nearly 8 billion Sweethearts per year. Similar products are available from Brach's and other companies. A similar type of candy is sold in the UK under the name Love Hearts.

History
Oliver R. Chase invented a machine in 1847 to cut lozenges from wafer candy, similar to Necco Wafers, and started a candy factory.
Daniel Chase, Oliver's brother, began printing sayings on the candy in 1866. He designed a machine that was able to press on the candy similar to a stamp. The candy was often used for weddings since the candies had witty saying such as: "Married in pink, he will take a drink", "Married in White, you have chosen right", and "Married in Satin, Love will not be lasting".

The heart-shaped conversation candies to be called Sweethearts got their start in 1901. Other styles were formerly produced such as lozenges, postcards, horseshoes, watches, and baseballs. Line extensions carrying the Sweethearts brand include chocolates and sugar-free hearts.

In the 1990s, Necco vice-president Walter Marshall wanted to update some of the sayings and retire others, including "Call me", "Email me", and "Fax me". The romantic expressions continue to be revised for young Americans. Necco received hundreds of suggestions a year on new sayings.

Necco produced the hearts year-round, but mixing of colors and packaging were ramped up beginning in September to meet the demand for the product at Valentine's Day.  Approximately  of hearts were made per day, which sells out in about six weeks.  The company produces 8 billion hearts per year.

Flavor change
In 2010, the classic pastel candy formula was abandoned. Sweethearts were made softer with vivid colors and new flavors. These new flavors included sour apple, strawberry, and "spring fresh." The changes to the flavors and messages were unpopular with some fans.

Bankruptcy and return 
In 2018, Necco declared bankruptcy. The original plant closed and their candy brands were sold off. The rights to Sweethearts were acquired by Spangler Candy Company. With the purchase of the brand by Spangler, Sweethearts were unavailable for Valentine's Day 2019 as Spangler set up production of the confections in a new plant. Sweethearts returned in 2020 with the original flavors from before Necco's 2010 change, but due to equipment problems, the familiar sayings were largely either incomplete or missing entirely.

See also
 Fortune cookie
 Love Hearts British candy version of Sweethearts
 List of confectionery brands

References

External links
 NECCO's website

Brand name confectionery
Holiday foods
Necco brands
Products introduced in 1901
Valentine's Day
Companies that filed for Chapter 11 bankruptcy in 2018